Matko Perdijić (born 26 May 1982 in Split) is a Croatian retired football goalkeeper who last played for Zagłębie Sosnowiec.

Career
As a 22-year-old, Perdijić joined Hajduk Split from Mosor at the start of 2005. After he finished a lengthy spell in Poland, he was appointed goalkeeper coach at Zagłębie Sosnowiec in January 2022.

References

External links
 
 

1982 births
Living people
Footballers from Split, Croatia
Association football goalkeepers
Croatian footballers
NK Mosor players
HNK Hajduk Split players
HNK Šibenik players
NK GOŠK Dubrovnik players
Ruch Chorzów players
MKS Cracovia (football) players
Widzew Łódź players
Polonia Bytom players
Zagłębie Sosnowiec players
Ekstraklasa players
I liga players
II liga players
Croatian expatriate footballers
Expatriate footballers in Poland
Croatian expatriate sportspeople in Poland